Greatest Hits is a compilation album by the American rock band Heart. This compilation collects Heart's hits from 1975 through 1983, with one all-new studio recording, the Diane Warren-penned "Strong, Strong Wind", the song also recorded by Air Supply for their 1997 album The Book of Love. The collection, which was limited to release in the U.S. and Japan, acted as a 'first volume' of two greatest hits releases, the companion being the widely released Greatest Hits: 1985–1995 (2000). Other territories confusingly experienced the Capitol Records release of These Dreams: Greatest Hits (1997) instead of this collection, which featured a selection of tracks from 1976–1995.

Track listing

References

1998 greatest hits albums
Heart (band) compilation albums
Epic Records compilation albums
Legacy Recordings compilation albums